Midway is an unincorporated community in Clay County, Tennessee, United States.

References

Unincorporated communities in Clay County, Tennessee
Unincorporated communities in Tennessee